
Year 247 BC was a year of the pre-Julian Roman calendar. At the time it was known as the Year of the Consulship of Metellus and Buteo (or, less frequently, year 507 Ab urbe condita). The denomination 247 BC for this year has been used since the early medieval period, when the Anno Domini calendar era became the prevalent method in Europe for naming years.

Events 
 By place 
 Carthage 
 By this stage in the Punic War, Carthage has lost to Rome all its Sicilian possessions except Lilybaeum (now Marsala) and Drepanum (now Trapani). In the winter of 248/7, Hamilcar Barca takes over the chief command of the Carthaginian forces in Sicily at a time when the island is almost completely in the hands of the Romans. Landing on the north-west of the island with a small mercenary force, he seizes a strong position on Mount Ercte (Monte Pellegrino, near Palermo), and not only successfully defends himself against all attacks, but also carries his raids as far as the coast of southern Italy.

 Roman Republic 
 Rome enters into a treaty, on equal terms, with Hiero II, the tyrant of Syracuse.

 China 
 General Wang He of the State of Qin takes the city of Shangdang from the State of Zhao and establishes Taiyuan Commandery.
 After an initial defeat of Wei general Wuji in the Battle of Hewai, the armies of Qin, led by Meng Ao and Wang He, defeat a combined attempt by the other kingdoms of China to break through the strategic Hangu Pass and invade the Qin heartland of Guanzhong.
 The 13-year-old Ying Zheng, later called Qin Shi Huang, succeeds his father Zhuangxiang of Qin (Zichu) on the throne. Prime Minister Lü Buwei becomes the regent of the king.

Births 
 Hannibal Barca, Carthaginian military commander (d. c. 183 BC)

Deaths 
 Alexander of Corinth, Macedonian Greek governor and tyrant
 Moggaliputta-Tissa, Indian Buddhist monk and philosopher
 Zhuangxiang of Qin, Chinese king of the Qin State (b. 281 BC)

References